Trevor White (born 3 August 1947, Chelmsford, Essex, United Kingdom) is a British-Australian singer-songwriter.

Biography

1961–1970: Sounds Incorporated

In 1961, White auditioned for, and was successful in joining British instrumentalist group Sounds Incorporated, as vocals, and playing keyboard, piano, drums. The group visited Australia 3 times in 3 years and disbanded whilst in Perth in 1971.

1972–1981: Solo career
After the disbandment of Sounds Incorporated, White auditioned for the Australian production of Jesus Christ Superstar and took the role of Jesus and relocated to Australia. White contributed to the original cast recording of the album.

In the 1975 musical comedy The Rocky Horror Picture Show, White dubbed the singing voice of Rocky, who was played by Peter Hinwood.

In 1976, White signing with Polydor Records and released Out of the Shadows. The album spawns two top 100 singles. In 1980, White signed with CBS and released two further singles.

Discography

Albums

Singles

References

Australian male singers
Australian musicians
Australian singer-songwriters
Living people
1947 births